Cai Chang (14 May 1900 – 11 September 1990) was a Chinese politician and women's rights activist who was the first chair of the All-China Women's Federation, a Chinese women's rights organization.

Early life 
Cai Chang was born in 1900 to a lower middle class family in China. Her mother left her husband, and enabled her children to attend school by selling her belongings. Cai believed strongly in women's education, and spurned the idea of marriage in favor of a vow of celibacy. Her mother aided her in this by avoiding an arranged marriage for Cai. Cai attended the Zhounan Girls' Middle School at Changsha until 1916. In the winter of 1917–1918, she became one of the first women to join the New People's Study Society, a work study program put in place by Mao Zedong and Cai's brother, Cai Hesen. This group advocated for women to create their own self-help groups and to become active in politics.

Cai, her mother, Cai Hesen, and Cai Hesen's future wife Xiang Jingyu went to Europe, where Cai was a factory worker. She studied anarchism, Marxism, and Leninism alongside other Chinese socialist feminist scholars, including at the Communist University of the Toilers of the East in Moscow.

In 1922, Cai married Li Fuchun, a prominent communist.

Career 
In 1921, Cai returned to China, where she studied to become a physical education teacher. She taught for four years at the Zhounan Girls' School, which she had attended several years earlier. During this time, she joined the Communist Party of China.

Cai left her teaching job to work for the Central Women's Department in the Nationalist Party in 1925. Two years later, she joined the Central Women's Committee, leading it in Xiang Jingyu's absence. She helped to create the Marriage Decree of 1930, which declared that "free choice must be the basic principle of every marriage." She also helped write the Provisional Constitution of 1931. From 1934 to 1935, she joined her husband Li Fuchun on the Long March.

Cai was well known in China after 1949, where she led the All-China Women's Federation under the People's Republic of China. Part of her work in the ACWF included creating a strategy to help privileged women take a leading role in scientific and cultural improvements. This earned her criticism, however, as it supported the Communist Party of China's views that emphasized technological and economic improvement over women's liberation and advantaged only powerful women; it did not help lower-class women, but rather returned them to their pre-war roles.

See also

 Historical Museum of French-Chinese Friendship

References 

1900 births
1990 deaths
20th-century Chinese women politicians
All-China Women's Federation people
Burials at Babaoshan Revolutionary Cemetery
Chinese Communist Party politicians from Hunan
Chinese women's rights activists
Delegates to the 5th National Congress of the Chinese Communist Party
Educators from Hunan
People's Republic of China politicians from Hunan
Politicians from Xiangtan
Republic of China politicians from Hunan
Vice Chairpersons of the National People's Congress